CLOCK (from circadian locomotor output cycles kaput) is a gene encoding a basic helix-loop-helix-PAS transcription factor that is known to affect both the persistence and period of circadian rhythms.

Research shows that the  gene plays a major role as an activator of downstream elements in the pathway critical to the generation of circadian rhythms.

Discovery 
The CLOCK gene was first identified in 1997 by Joseph Takahashi and his colleagues. Takahashi used forward mutagenesis screening of mice treated with N-ethyl-N-nitrosourea to create and identify mutations in key genes that broadly affect circadian activity. The CLOCK mutants discovered through the screen displayed an abnormally long period of daily activity. This trait proved to be heritable. Mice bred to be heterozygous showed longer periods of 24.4 hours compared to the control 23.3 hour period. Mice homozygous for the mutation showed 27.3 hour periods, but eventually lost all circadian rhythmicity after several days in constant darkness. That showed that "intact CLOCK genes" are necessary for normal mammalian circadian function .

Function 
CLOCK protein has been found to play a central role as a transcription factor in the circadian pacemaker. In Drosophila, newly synthesized CLOCK (CLK) is hypophosphorylated in the cytoplasm before entering the nucleus. Once in the nuclei, CLK is localized in nuclear foci and is later redistributed homogeneously. CYCLE (CYC) (also known as dBMAL for the BMAL1 ortholog in mammals) dimerizes with CLK via their respective PAS domains. This dimer then recruits co-activator CREB-binding protein (CBP) and is further phosphorylated. Once phosphorylated, this CLK-CYC complex binds to the E-box elements of the promoters of period (per) and timeless (tim) via its bHLH domain, causing the stimulation of gene expression of per and tim. A large molar excess of period (PER) and timeless (TIM) proteins causes formation of the PER-TIM heterodimer which prevents the CLK-CYC heterodimer from binding to the E-boxes of per and tim, essentially blocking per and tim transcription. CLK is hyperphosphorylated when doubletime (DBT) kinase interacts with the CLK-CYC complex in a PER reliant manner, destabilizing both CLK and PER, leading to the degradation of both proteins. Hypophosphorylated CLK then accumulates, binds to the E-boxes of per and tim and activates their transcription once again. This cycle of post-translational phosphorylation suggest that temporal phosphorylation of CLK helps in the timing mechanism of the circadian clock.

A similar model is found in mice, in which BMAL1 dimerizes with CLOCK to activate per and cryptochrome (cry) transcription. PER and CRY proteins form a heterodimer which acts on the CLOCK-BMAL heterodimer to repress the transcription of per and cry. The heterodimer CLOCK:BMAL1 functions similarly to other transcriptional activator complexes; CLOCK:BMAL1 interacts with the E-box regulatory elements. PER and CRY proteins accumulate and dimerize during subjective night, and translocate into the nucleus to interact with the CLOCK:BMAL1 complex, directly inhibiting their own expression. This research has been conducted and validated through crystallographic analysis.

CLOCK exhibits histone acetyl transferase (HAT) activity, which is enhanced by dimerization with BMAL1. Dr. Paolo Sassone-Corsi and colleagues demonstrated in vitro that CLOCK mediated HAT activity is necessary to rescue circadian rhythms in Clock mutants.

Role in other feedback loops 

The CLOCK-BMAL dimer is involved in regulation of other genes and feedback loops. An enzyme SIRT1 also binds to the CLOCK-BMAL complex and acts to suppress its activity, perhaps by deacetylation of Bmal1 and surrounding histones. However, SIRT1's role is still controversial and it may also have a role in deacetylating PER protein, targeting it for degradation.

The CLOCK-BMAL dimer acts as a positive limb of a feedback loop. The binding of CLOCK-BMAL to an E-box promoter element activates transcription of clock genes such as per1, 2, and 3 and tim in mice. It has been shown in mice that CLOCK-BMAL also activates the Nicotinamide phosphoribosyltransferase gene (also called Nampt), part of a separate feedback loop. This feedback loop creates a metabolic oscillator. The CLOCK-BMAL dimer activates transcription of the Nampt gene, which codes for the NAMPT protein. NAMPT is part of a series of enzymatic reactions that covert niacin (also called nicotinamide) to NAD. SIRT1, which requires NAD for its enzymatic activity, then uses increased NAD levels to suppress BMAL1 through deacetylation. This suppression results in less transcription of the NAMPT, less NAMPT protein, less NAD made, and therefore less SIRT1 and less suppression of the CLOCK-BMAL dimer. This dimer can again positively activate the Nampt gene transcription and the cycle continues, creating another oscillatory loop involving CLOCK-BMAL as positive elements. The key role that Clock plays in metabolic and circadian loops highlights the close relationship between metabolism and circadian clocks.

Mutants 

Clock mutant organisms can either possess a null mutation or an antimorphic allele at the Clock locus that codes for an antagonist to the wild-type protein. The presence of an antimorphic protein downregulates the transcriptional products normally upregulated by Clock.

Drosophila

In Drosophila, a mutant form of Clock (Jrk) was identified by Allada, Hall, and Rosbash in 1998. The team used forward genetics to identify non-circadian rhythms in mutant flies. Jrk results from a premature stop codon that eliminates the activation domain of the CLOCK protein. This mutation causes dominant effects: half of the heterozygous flies with this mutant gene have a lengthened period of 24.8 hours, while the other half become arrhythmic. Homozygous flies lose their circadian rhythm. Furthermore, the same researchers demonstrated that these mutant flies express low levels of PER and TIM proteins, indicating that Clock functions as a positive element in the circadian loop. While the mutation affects the circadian clock of the fly, it does not cause any physiological or behavioral defects. The similar sequence between Jrk and its mouse homolog suggests common circadian rhythm components were present in both Drosophila and mice ancestors. A recessive allele of Clock leads to behavioral arrhythmicity while maintaining detectable molecular and transcriptional oscillations. This suggests that Clk contributes to the amplitude of circadian rhythms.

Mice 

The mouse homolog to the Jrk mutant is the ClockΔ19 mutant that possesses a deletion in exon 19 of the Clock gene. This dominant-negative mutation results in a defective CLOCK-BMAL dimer, which causes mice to have a decreased ability to activate per transcription. In constant darkness, ClockΔ19 mice heterozygous for the Clock mutant allele exhibit lengthened circadian periods, while ClockΔ19/Δ19 mice homozygous for the allele become arrhythmic. In both heterozygotes and homozygotes, this mutation also produces lengthened periods and arrhythmicity at the single-cell level.

Clock -/- null mutant mice, in which Clock has been knocked out, display completely normal circadian rhythms. The discovery of a null Clock mutant with a wild-type phenotype directly challenged the widely accepted premise that Clock is necessary for normal circadian function. Furthermore, it suggested that the CLOCK-BMAL1 dimer need not exist to modulate other elements of the circadian pathway. Neuronal PAS domain containing protein 2 (NPAS2, a CLOCK paralog) can substitute for CLOCK in these Clock-null mice. Mice with one NPAS2 allele showed shorter periods at first, but eventual arrhythmic behavior.

Observed effects 
In humans, a polymorphism in Clock, rs6832769, may be related to the personality trait agreeableness. Another single nucleotide polymorphism (SNP) in Clock, 3111C, has been associated with diurnal preference. This SNP is also associated with increased insomnia, difficulty losing weight, and recurrence of major depressive episodes in patients with bipolar disorder.

In mice, Clock has been implicated in sleep disorders, metabolism, pregnancy, and mood disorders. Clock mutant mice sleep less than normal mice each day. The mice also display altered levels of plasma glucose and rhythms in food intake. These mutants develop metabolic syndrome symptoms over time. Furthermore, Clock mutants demonstrate disrupted estrous cycles and increased rates of full-term pregnancy failure. Mutant Clock has also been linked to bipolar disorder-like symptoms in mice, including mania and euphoria. Clock mutant mice also exhibit increased excitability of dopamine neurons in reward centers of the brain. These results have led Colleen McClung to propose using Clock mutant mice as a model for human mood and behavior disorders.

The CLOCK-BMAL dimer has also been shown to activate reverse-erb receptor alpha (Rev-ErbA alpha) and retinoic acid orphan receptor alpha (ROR-alpha). REV-ERBα and RORα regulate Bmal by binding to retinoic acid-related orphan receptor response elements (ROREs) in its promoter.

Variations in the epigenetics of the Clock gene may lead to an increased risk of breast cancer. It was found that in women with breast cancer, there was significantly less methylation of the Clock promoter region. It was also noted that this effect was greater in women with estrogen and progesterone receptor-negative tumors.

The CLOCK gene may also be a target for somatic mutations in microsatellite unstable colorectal cancers. Approximately half of putative novel microsatellite instability target genes responsible for colorectal cancer contained CLOCK mutations. Nascent research in the expression of circadian genes in adipose tissue suggests that suppression of the CLOCK gene may causally correlate not only with obesity, but also with type 2 diabetes, with quantitative physical responses to circadian food intake as potential inputs to the clock system.

See also 
 BMAL1 gene
 Cycle gene
 Familial sleep traits
 PDF (gene)
 Period gene
 Pigment dispersing factor (pdf)
 Suprachiasmatic nucleus
 Timeless gene

References

Further reading

External links 
 
 Dictionary of Circadian Physiology
 

PAS-domain-containing proteins